Vinialesaurus is a genus of plesiosaur from the Late Jurassic (Oxfordian) Jagua Formation of Pinar del Río, Cuba. The type species is Vinialesaurus caroli, first described as Cryptocleidus caroli by De la Torre and Rojas in 1949 under the holotype MNHNCu P 3008, and redescribed by Gasparini, Bardet and Iturralde in 2002. The authors of the 2002 paper considered Vinialesaurus distinct enough from Cryptocleidus to warrant its own genus, but it was broadly similar to Cryptocleidus.

The name Vinialesaurus honors Viñales, the town in western Cuba where the fossils of Vinialesaurus was discovered. These fossils consist of a mostly complete skull, jaw, and portions of the vertebrae.

See also 

 List of plesiosaur genera
 Timeline of plesiosaur research

References

External links 
 Vinialesaurus in the Plesiosaur site

Cryptoclidids
Late Jurassic plesiosaurs
Oxfordian life
Late Jurassic reptiles of North America
Jurassic plesiosaurs of North America
Jurassic Cuba
Fossils of Cuba
Fossil taxa described in 2002
Taxa named by Zulma Brandoni de Gasparini
Sauropterygian genera